Rose Pauly may refer to:
Rose Pauly (politician) (born 1938), a German politician
Rose Pauly (singer) (1894–1975), a Hungarian-born opera singer